Avco Corporation is a subsidiary of Textron, which operates Textron Systems Corporation and Lycoming.

History
The Aviation Corporation was formed on March 2, 1929, to prevent a takeover of CAM-24 airmail service operator Embry-Riddle Company by Clement Melville Keys, who planned on buying Curtiss aircraft rather than Sherman Fairchild's. With capital from Fairchild, George Hann, the Lehman Brothers, and W. A. Harriman, the holding company began acquiring small airlines. By the end of 1929, it had acquired interests in over 90 aviation-related companies. In January 1930, the board broke off the airlines into Colonial and Universal Air Lines. Universal Air Lines name was changed to American Airways, and later merged with Colonial to form American Airlines.

The company was required to divest American Airlines in 1934 due to new rules for air mail contracts. The Aviation Corporation ranked 32nd among United States corporations in the value of World War II production contracts. Two months after World War II ended the Aviation Corporation branched into the manufacture of farm machinery with its acquisition of the New Idea Company in October 1945. The company later changed its name to Avco Manufacturing Corporation, and then, in 1959, to Avco Corporation. In 1984 Avco sold its farm machinery division to White Farm Equipment and Avco was purchased by Textron.

Avco's affiliated company, Avco Financial Services, was spun off to Associates First Capital in 1998,  which itself was acquired by Citigroup in 2000.

Early companies bought or merged by Avco

Aviation Corporation - formed March 29 1929
Southern Air Transport
Colonial Air Lines - May 1929
Colonial Western - May 1929
Canadian Colonial Airways - May 1929
Embry-Riddle Aviation Corporation - Summer 1929, Embry-Riddle Flying School closed 1930
Interstate Airlines - Summer 1929
Fairchild Aircraft
Wien Air Alaska
Kreider-Reisner
The Superplane Company
Universal Air Line System Terminal Company
Midplane Sales and Transit Company
Northern Airplane Company
Air Transportation, Inc.
Robertson Flying School Inc.
Egyptian Airways Inc.
Universal Aviation Corporation - bought by Avco in 1930
Universal Aviation Schools
Roosevelt Field, New York
Curtiss Field
Southwest Air Fast Express - June 1931

Avco timeline

1929 Aviation Corporation (AVCO) holding company formed by multiple participants
1932 Airplane Development Corporation formed as a subsidiary of the Cord Corporation by Gerard F. "Jerry" Vultee
1934 AVCO acquired the Airplane Development Corporation from Cord and formed the Aviation Manufacturing Corporation (AMC)
1936 AMC liquidated to form the Vultee Aircraft Division, an autonomous subsidiary of AVCO
1939 Vultee Aircraft Division of AVCO reorganized as an independent company known as Vultee Aircraft, Inc.
1940 Barkley-Grow Aircraft acquired by AVCO
1941 Consolidated Aircraft Corporation sold to AVCO
1943 Consolidated-Vultee, known as Convair, formed by the merger of Consolidated Aircraft and Vultee Aircraft; still controlled by AVCO
1945 AVCO acquired the New Idea Company from the heirs of Joseph Oppenheim who founded the farm machinery manufacturer in 1899.
1945 AVCO acquired Crosley Corporation from Powel Crosley Jr.
1947 Convair acquired by the Atlas Corporation
1947 AVCO name changed to Avco Manufacturing Corporation
1951 Purchased Bendix Home Appliances, South Bend, Indiana manufacturer of automatic clothes washers, combining Bendix Appliances with Crosley Appliances
1956 Avco sold Bendix Home Appliances to Philco
1959 Avco Manufacturing Corporation name changed to Avco Corporation
1966 Avco acquired Carte Blanche charge cards from First National City Bank
1967 Avco acquires Embassy Pictures
1968 Avco acquires the developer of Rancho Bernardo, San Diego
1971 Avco acquires a stake in the developer of Laguna Niguel, California
1975-1977 Crosley Broadcasting stations divested
1976 Sold rights to Crosley Appliances to Crosley Corporation, a new distributor who contracted for appliances from companies such as Whirlpool Corporation and Electrolux
1978 Sold Carte Blanche to Citibank
1982 Sold Embassy Pictures to Norman Lear and Jerry Perenchio
1984 Avco sold the New Idea line of farm machinery to Allied Corporation, which then purchased the White Farm Equipment, forming White-New Idea 
1984 Textron acquires Avco Corporation, renames it Avco Systems Textron
1985 Avco Systems Textron becomes Textron Defense Systems
1995 Textron Systems Corporation is created, consisting of what is now Textron Defense Systems, Textron Marine & Land Systems, and Lycoming

Locations
 Coldwater, Ohio (1945 - 1984)
 Stratford Army Engine Plant (1951 - 1976)
Connersville, Indiana (1937 - 1960) AVCO purchases assets of Cord's Auburn Automobile Company in 1937. Manufactures kitchen appliances until sale in 1959 to Design and Manufacturing dishwasher division. Manufactures 500,000 Jeep bodies for Overland and Ford during WWII. 1959 AVCO sells to Sam Reginstrief, 1960 AVCO sells to HH Robertson and moves munitions to Richmond, Indiana, former Crosley Plant. 
 Nashville, Tennessee (1959 - 1985)

See also
 Avco World Trophy
 AVCOAT 5026-39
 Crosley Broadcasting Corporation (later Avco Broadcasting Corporation)
 M2 (railcar) (part of this series was built by Avco)

References

External links

 Textron website
 The Aviation Corporation Annual Reports: 1929, 1933–1939, 1941–1946 – Internet Archive

Aircraft engine manufacturers of the United States
Manufacturing companies based in Connecticut
Companies based in Greenwich, Connecticut
Textron
Manufacturing companies established in 1929
American companies established in 1929
1929 establishments in Delaware
1984 mergers and acquisitions

fr:Usine Avco de Stratford